The Liberia national football team, nicknamed the Lone Stars, represents Liberia in men's international football and is controlled by the Liberia Football Association. Although the nation produced the 1995 FIFA World Player of the Year, George Weah, its football team has never qualified for the FIFA World Cup and has qualified for the Africa Cup of Nations just twice—in 1996 and 2002. It is a member of both FIFA and the Confederation of African Football (CAF).

History

African Cup of Nations

In 1967 Liberia played in its first African Cup of Nations qualifying campaign, drawing its first match 2–2 against Guinea. They also drew against Senegal however lost both returning fixtures and were eliminated in the first round. Liberia returned to qualifying in 1976 but lost in the preliminary round to Togo, falling to defeat in both fixtures. After another absence, Liberia again joined AFCON qualifying in 1982 in the preliminary rounds but failed to progress after two draws against Gambia, losing on the away goals rule.

Liberia withdrew from qualifying for the 1984 African Cup of Nations, but the following tournament they managed to secure their first win during qualifying, a 3–1 first leg victory over Mauritania. They failed to capitalize on this advantage, losing 3–0 in the second leg. Liberia then faced Sierra Leone and Mali during the 1988 qualification and 1990 qualification respectively, but again failed to progress. In 1992, Liberia withdrew from qualifying before playing a match and in 1994, Liberia was put into a group with two participants that withdrew during qualifying (Tanzania and Burkina Faso) however they failed to take advantage of this, and finished with zero points, having lost to Ghana twice.

In the 1996 African Cup of Nations qualification, Liberia managed to register three wins (against Togo, Tunisia and Mauritania) and four draws, which saw them finish the group in second place and qualify for their first African Cup of Nations tournament. Following the withdrawal of Nigeria, Liberia were placed in a group with Gabon and Zaire. Liberia opened the tournament with a 2–1 victory over Gabon with goals from Kelvin Sebwe and Mass Sarr Jr., but lost 2–0 to Zaire. This meant that Liberia finished bottom of the group on goal difference and failed to progress to the knock-out stages.

Liberia missed out on returning to the African Cup of Nations in 1998 as they finished one point off of qualification. In 2000, they defeated Niger in the preliminary rounds, but again failed to advance to the main tournament, this time finishing behind Algeria on goal-difference. 

In 2002 African Cup of Nations qualification, Liberia beat Cape Verde in the preliminary rounds, then they finished top of their group to qualify for the main tournament for the second time in their history. In the 2002 African Cup of Nations, Liberia drew their first game 1–1 with Mali (goal scored by George Weah) and drew their second game 2–2 against Algeria (goals from Prince Daye and Kelvin Sebwe), but in their final group game, needing a win against Nigeria, they lost 1–0.

FIFA World Cup 

Liberia first entered the qualifying process for the FIFA World Cup in 1966, however they withdrew in protest against the fact that too few places had been reserved for Africa and Asia, along with all fourteen other African nations that had initially entered qualifying. 

Liberia next entered qualifying in 1982 against Guinea after receiving a bye in the first round. They lost 1–0 over the two legs and were eliminated. In 1986, Liberia was again eliminated without having scored a goal, falling 4–0 to Nigeria. In 1990, Liberia won its first FIFA qualifying match defeating Ghana to progress to the second round. Despite finishing second in their group, Liberia failed to advance to the final qualification round, ending two points behind group winners Egypt.

In 1998, Liberia beat Gambia in the first qualification round, but finished twelve points adrift of Tunisia in their group. In 2002, Liberia had their strongest qualifying campaign, however a loss against Ghana in their penultimate group game gave Nigeria the opportunity to overtake them and secure the only qualification spot.

Results and fixtures

The following is a list of match results in the last 12 months, as well as any future matches that have been scheduled.

2022

2023

Coaching staff

Coaching history
Caretaker managers are listed in italics

  Josiah Johnson (1971–78)
  Bert Trautmann (1978–80)
  Paulo Campos (1986)
  Walter Pelham (1986–1998)
  Wilfred Lardner (1998–1999)
  Kadalah Kromah (1999–2000)
  Philippe Redon (2000–02)
  Dominic George Vava (2002)
  Kadalah Kromah (2002–04)
  Joseph Sayon (2004–06)
  Shawky El Din (2006)
  Frank Jericho Nagbe (2006–08)
  Antoine Hey (2008–09)
  Bertalan Bicskei (2010–11)
  Roberto Landi (2011–12)
  Thomas Kojo (2012)
  Kaetu Smith (2012)
  Frank Jericho Nagbe (2013)
  Thomas Kojo (2013)
  James Debbah (2013–17)
  Thomas Kojo (2018)
  Peter Butler (2019–2022)
  Ansumana Keita (2022)
  Thomas Kojo (2022-2023)
  Ansumana Keita (2023-present)

Players

Current squad
The following players were called up for the 2023 Africa Cup of Nations qualification match against Morocco. 

Caps and goals correct as of 13 June 2022.

Recent call-ups
The following players have been called up for the team in the last 12 months.

Records

Players in bold are still active with Liberia.

Most appearances

Top goalscorers

Competitive record

FIFA World Cup

Africa Cup of Nations record

Achievements
West African Nations Cup :
1 Time Runners-up
CEDEAO Cup :
1 Time Runners-up

Notes

References

External links

 Official Website
 Liberia at FIFA.com
 Liberian-Soccer.com fan site
 Liberia national football team

 
African national association football teams